Teatro Popular Caracol ("Popular Theatre Caracol") is a Colombian television anthology drama series, broadcast between 1972 and 1978 on the state-owned channels Primera Cadena and Segunda Cadena. It was produced by Caracol TV.

The programme was intended to "popularize the works of great writers of the universal literature, including Colombian writers, played by the most important figures at the time" in Colombian television. It received a Premio Ondas in 1975.

References 

1970s Colombian television series
1972 Colombian television series debuts
1978 Colombian television series endings
Colombian anthology television series
Black-and-white television shows